Jyoti (born 11 December 1999) is an Indian field hockey player who plays as a forward for the Indian national team.

She was part of the Indian squad at the 2022 Women's Hockey Asia Cup which won the bronze medal.

References

External links
Jyoti at Hockey India

1999 births
Living people
Indian female field hockey players
Female field hockey forwards
People from Sonipat
Field hockey players from Haryana
Sportswomen from Haryana
Field hockey players at the 2022 Commonwealth Games
Commonwealth Games bronze medallists for India
Commonwealth Games medallists in field hockey
Medallists at the 2022 Commonwealth Games